Jianghan may refer to:

Jianghan District, in Wuhan, Hubei, China
Jianghan University, in Wuhan, Hubei, China
Jianghan Plain, in central and eastern Hubei, China

See also
Kong Hon or Jiang Han, Hong Kong actor